During the 1965–66 English football season, Everton F.C. competed in the Football League First Division.

Final League Table

Results

Football League First Division

FA Cup

Inter-Cities Fairs Cup

Squad

References

1965–66
Everton F.C. season